William Kopp is an American animator, writer and voice actor.

Career
Kopp studied animation at the California Institute of the Arts. In 1984, he won a Merit Award from the Student Academy Awards for Mr. Gloom. In 1985, he won a Student Academy Award for Observational Hazard.

Kopp animated the Whammy on the 1980s game show Press Your Luck and voiced the title character on Fox's Eek! The Cat and Kutter in The Terrible Thunderlizards, which he created with Savage Steve Holland. He also voiced Tom in the Tom and Jerry films Tom and Jerry: Blast Off to Mars and Tom and Jerry: The Fast and the Furry.

He was an animator for The Tracey Ullman Show "The Simpsons" shorts, but left after one season.

Kopp created The Shnookums and Meat Funny Cartoon Show and Mad Jack the Pirate, worked as an executive producer and writer for Toonsylvania, produced and directed Tom and Jerry cartoons, wrote Hare and Loathing in Las Vegas and The Incredible Crash Dummies.  Kopp worked on the story of the three Roger Rabbit Shorts, Tummy Trouble, Roller Coaster Rabbit, and Trail Mix-Up. He was also the writer/director/co-producer on Tales from the Crypt'''s series finale "The Third Pig".

He was the director of most episodes of The Twisted Whiskers Show.

Kopp is a regular on Cartoon Network's Mighty Magiswords'' providing the voice of Man Fish the Fish Man.

He currently resides in California.

Filmography

Film

Television

References

External links
 

Living people
20th-century American male actors
21st-century American male actors
20th-century American artists
21st-century American artists
American male voice actors
American voice directors
Animators from Illinois
People from Rockford, Illinois
California Institute of the Arts alumni
American casting directors
Film directors from Illinois
American animated film directors
American storyboard artists
American television writers
American male television writers
Screenwriters from Illinois
Year of birth missing (living people)